Lancaster County (Pennsylvania Dutch: Lengeschder Kaundi), sometimes nicknamed the Garden Spot of America or Pennsylvania Dutch Country, is  a county in the Commonwealth of Pennsylvania. It is located in the south central part of Pennsylvania. As of the 2020 census, the population was 552,984. Its county seat is Lancaster. Lancaster County comprises the Lancaster, Pennsylvania metropolitan statistical area.

Lancaster County is a tourist destination with its Amish community a major attraction. Contrary to popular belief, the word "Dutch" in "Pennsylvania Dutch" is not a mistranslation, but rather a corruption of the Pennsylvania German endonym Deitsch, which means "Pennsylvania Dutch / German" or "German". Ultimately, the terms Deitsch, Dutch, Diets, and Deutsch are all cognates of the Proto-Germanic word  meaning "popular" or "of the people". The continued use of "Dutch" instead of "German" was strengthened by the Pennsylvania Dutch in the 19th century as a way of distinguishing themselves from later (post 1830) waves of German immigrants to the United States, with the Pennsylvania Dutch referring to themselves as Deitsche and to Germans as Deitschlenner (literally "Germany-ers", compare Deutschland-er) whom they saw as a related but distinct group.

The ancestors of the Amish began to immigrate to colonial Pennsylvania in the early 18th century to take advantage of the religious freedom offered by William Penn. They were also attracted by the area's rich soil and mild climate. Also attracted to promises of religious freedom, French Huguenots fleeing religious persecution settled this area in 1710. There were also significant numbers of English, Welsh and Ulster Scots (also known as the Scotch-Irish in the colonies).

History
The area that became Lancaster County was part of William Penn's 1681 charter. John Kennerly received the first recorded deed from Penn in 1691. Although Matthias Kreider was said to have been in the area as early as 1691, there is no evidence that any Europeans settled in Lancaster County before 1710.

Lancaster County was part of Chester County, Pennsylvania, until May 10, 1729, when it was organized as the colony's fourth county. It was named after the city of Lancaster in the county of Lancashire in England, the native home of John Wright, an early settler. As settlement increased, six other counties were subsequently formed from territory directly taken, in all or in part, from Lancaster County: Berks (1752), Cumberland (1750), Dauphin (1785), Lebanon (1813), Northumberland (1772), and York (1749). Many other counties were in turn formed from these six.

Indigenous peoples
Indigenous peoples had occupied the areas along the waterways for thousands of years, and established varying cultures. Historic Native American tribes in the area at the time of European encounter included the Shawnee, Susquehannock, Gawanese, Lenape (or Delaware), and Nanticoke peoples, who were from different language families and had distinct cultures.

Among the earliest recorded inhabitants of the Susquehanna River valley were the Iroquoian-speaking Susquehannock, whose name was derived from the Lenape term for "Oyster River People". (The Lenape spoke an Algonquian language.) The English called them the Conestoga, after the name of their principal village, Gan'ochs'a'go'jat'ga ("Roof-place" or "town"), anglicized as "Conestoga." Other places occupied by the Susquehannock were Ka'ot'sch'ie'ra ("Place-crawfish"), where present-day Chickisalunga developed, and Gasch'guch'sa ("Great-fall-in-river"), now called Conewago Falls, Lancaster County.

Other Native tribes, as well as early European settlers, considered the Susquehannock a mighty nation, experts in war and trade. They were beaten only by the combined power of the Five Nation Iroquois Confederacy, after colonial Maryland withdrew its support. After 1675, the Susquehannock were totally absorbed by the Iroquois. A handful were settled at "New Conestoga," located along the south bank of the Conestoga River in Conestoga Township of the county. They helped staff an Iroquois consulate to the English in Maryland and Virginia (and later, Pennsylvania). By the 1720s, the colonists considered the Conestoga Indians as a "civilized" or "friendly tribe," having been converted in large part to Christianity, speaking English as a second language, making brooms and baskets for sale, and naming children after their favorite neighbors.

The outbreak of Pontiac's War in the summer of 1763, coupled with the ineffective policies of the provincial government, aroused widespread settler suspicion and hatred against all Indians in the frontier counties, without distinguishing among hostile and friendly peoples. On December 14, 1763, the Paxton Boys, led by Matthew Smith and Capt. Lazarus Stewart, attacked Conestoga, killing the six Indians present, and burning all the houses. Officials sheltered the tribe's fourteen survivors in protective custody in the county jail, but the Paxton Boys returned on December 27, broke into the jail, and massacred the remaining natives. The lack of effective government control and widespread sympathy in the frontier counties for the murderers meant they were never discovered or brought to justice.

Maryland-Pennsylvania boundary dispute

Pennsylvania had a longstanding dispute with Maryland about the southern border of the province and Lancaster County. Nine years of armed clashes accompanied the Maryland-Pennsylvania boundary dispute, which began soon after the 1730 establishment of Wright's Ferry across the Susquehanna River. Lord Baltimore believed that his grant to Maryland extended to the 40th parallel. This was about halfway between present-day Lancaster and the town of Willow Street, Pennsylvania. This line of demarcation would have resulted in Philadelphia being included in Maryland.

New settlers began to cross the Susquehanna. In 1730, the Wright's Ferry services were licensed and officially begun. Starting in mid-1730, Thomas Cresap, acting as an agent of Lord Baltimore, began confiscating the newly settled farms near present-day Peach Bottom and Columbia, Pennsylvania (at the time this was not named, but it was first called "Wright's Ferry", as noted on map). Believing he controlled this land under his grant, Lord Baltimore wanted the income from the lands. He believed he had a defensible claim established on the west bank of the Susquehanna since 1721, and that his demesne and grant extended to forty degrees north. If he allowed Pennsylvanians to settle his lands without reacting, their squatting would constitute a counter claim.

Cresap established a second ferry in the upper Conejohela downriver from John Wright's, near Peach Bottom. He demanded that settlers either move out or pay Maryland for the right-bank lands. Settlers believed they already had rights to these under Pennsylvania grants. Cresap drove off settlers by vandalizing farms and killing livestock; he pushed out settlers from southern York and Lancaster counties. He gave the abandoned lands to his followers. If a follower was arrested by Lancaster authorities, the Marylanders would break him out of the lockup.

Lord Baltimore negotiated a compromise in 1733, but Cresap ignored it and continued his raids. A deputy was sent to arrest him in 1734, and Cresap killed him at the door. The Pennsylvania governor demanded that Maryland arrest Cresap for murder; the Maryland governor instead commissioned him as a captain in the militia. In 1736, Cresap was finally arrested; he was jailed until 1737 when the King intervened. In 1750, a court decided that, by failing to develop the land with settlers, Lord Baltimore had forfeited his rights to a twenty-mile (32 km) swath of land. In 1767, a new Pennsylvania-Maryland border was officially established by the Mason-Dixon line.

Diversity of settlers
The names of the original Lancaster County townships reflect the diverse national origins of settlers in the new county: two had Welsh names (Caernarvon and Lampeter), three had Native American names (Cocalico, Conestoga and Peshtank or Paxton), six were English (Warwick, Lancaster, Martic, Sadsbury, Salisbury and Hempfield); four were Irish (Donegal, Drumore, Derry, and Leacock), reflecting mostly Scots-Irish (or Ulster Scots) from Ulster, a province in the north of Ireland; Manheim was German, Lebanon came from the Bible, a basis of all the European cultures; and Earl was a translation of the German surname of Graf or Groff.

19th-century statesmen
Lancaster County's native son James Buchanan, a Democrat, was elected as the 15th President of the United States in 1856, the first Pennsylvania native to hold the presidency. His home Wheatland is now operated as a house museum in Lancaster.

Thaddeus Stevens, the noted Radical Republican, represented Lancaster County in the United States House of Representatives from 1849 to 1853 and from 1859 until his death in 1868. Stevens left a $50,000 bequest to establish an orphanage. This property eventually was developed as the state-owned Thaddeus Stevens College of Technology. Stevens and Buchanan were both buried in Lancaster.

Slavery and the Christiana incident

Pennsylvania passed its gradual abolition law in 1780. The law, which freed the children of duly registered enslaved women at the age of twenty-eight, was a compromise between antislavery conviction and respect for white property rights. By the time the U.S. Congress passed the Fugitive Slave Law of 1850, Pennsylvania was effectively a free state, although it would not abolish slavery completely until the ratification of the Thirteenth Amendment. It did, however, pass a personal liberty law in 1847 that made it difficult for southerners to recover any enslaved persons who made their way into Pennsylvania.

Lying just north of the Mason-Dixon line, bordered by the Susquehanna River which had been a traditional route from the Chesapeake Bay watershed into the heart of what became Pennsylvania, Lancaster County was a significant destination of the Underground Railroad in the antebellum years. Many of the people of German descent opposed slavery and cooperated in aiding fugitive slaves. Local Lancaster County resident Charles Spotts found 17 stations. They included hiding places with trap doors, hidden vaults, a cave, and one with a brick tunnel leading to Octoraro Creek, a tributary of the Susquehanna.

As a wealthy Maryland wheat farmer, Edward Gorsuch had manumitted several slaves in their 20s. He allowed his slaves to work for cash elsewhere during the slow season. Upon finding some of his wheat missing, he thought his slaves had sold it to a local farmer. His slaves Noah Buley, Nelson Ford, George Ford, and Joshua Hammond, fearing his bad temper, fled across the Mason–Dixon line to the farm of William Parker, a mulatto free man and abolitionist who lived in Christiana, Pennsylvania. Parker, 29, was a member of the Lancaster Black Self-Protection Society and known to use violence to defend himself and the fugitive slaves who sought refuge in the area.

Gorsuch obtained four warrants and organized four parties, which set out separately with federal marshals to recover his property—the four slaves. He was killed and others were wounded. While Gorsuch was legally entitled to recover his slaves under the Fugitive Slave Act, it is not clear who precipitated the violence. The incident was variously called the "Christiana Riot", "Christiana Resistance", the "Christiana Outrage", and the "Christiana Tragedy". The Pennsylvania Anti-Slavery Society helped provide defense for the suspects charged in the case.

The event frightened slaveholders, as black men not only fought back but prevailed. Some feared this would inspire enslaved blacks and encourage rebelliousness. The case was prosecuted in Philadelphia U.S. District Court under the Fugitive Slave Act, which required citizens to cooperate in the capture and return of fugitive slaves. The disturbance increased regional and racial tensions. In the North, it added to the push to abolish slavery.

In September 1851, the grand jury returned a "true bill" (indictment) against 38 suspects, who were held in Philadelphia's Moyamensing Prison to await trial. U.S. District Judge Robert Cooper Grier ruled that the men could be tried for treason.

The only person actually tried was Castner Hanway, a European-American man. On November 15, 1851, he was tried for liberating slaves taken into custody by U.S. Marshal Kline, as well as for resisting arrest, conspiracy, and treason. Hanway's responsibility for the violent events was unclear. He was reported as one of the first on the scene where Gorsuch and others of his party were attacked, and he and his horse provided cover for Dickerson Gorsuch and Dr. Pearce, who were wounded. The jury deliberated 15 minutes before returning a Not Guilty. Among the five defense lawyers, recruited by the Pennsylvania Anti-Slavery Society, was U.S. Congressman Thaddeus Stevens, who had practiced law in Lancaster County since at least 1838.

Religious history
The oldest surviving dwelling of European settlers in the county is that of Mennonite Bishop Hans Herr, built in 1719. In 1989, Donald Kraybill counted 37 distinct religious bodies/organizations, with 289 congregations and 41,600 baptized members, among the plain sects who are descendants of the Anabaptist Mennonite immigrants to Lancaster County. The Mennonite Central Committee in Akron supports relief in disasters and provides manpower and material to local organizations in relief efforts.

The town of Lititz was originally planned as a closed community, founded early in the 1740s by members of the Moravian Church. The town eventually grew and welcomed its neighbors. The Moravian Church established Linden Hall School for Girls in 1746; it is one of the earliest educational institutions in continuous operation in the United States.

In addition to the Ephrata Cloister, the United Brethren in Christ and the Evangelical United Brethren (EUB) trace their beginnings to a 1767 meeting at the Isaac Long barn, near the hamlet of Oregon, in West Lampeter Township. The EUB, a German Methodist church, merged in 1968 with the traditionally English Methodist Episcopal Church to become the United Methodist Church.

The first Jewish resident was Isaac Miranda , from the Sephardic Jewish community of London, who owned property before the town and county were organized in 1730. Ten years later several Jewish families had settled in the town; on February 3, 1747, a deed to Isaac Nunus Ricus (Henriques) and Joseph Simon was recorded, conveying  of land "in trust for the society of Jews settled in and about Lancaster," to be used as a place of burial. This cemetery is still used by Congregation Shaarai Shomayim; it is considered the nation's fourth-oldest Jewish cemetery.

As of 2010, Lancaster County is home to three synagogues: the Orthodox Degel Israel; the Conservative Beth El; and the Reform Shaarai Shomayim. In 2003 Rabbi Elazar Green & Shira Green founded the Chabad Jewish Enrichment Center, a branch of the Chabad Lubavitch movement, that focuses on serving the Jewish students of Franklin and Marshall College, as well serving the general community with specific religious services. The Lancaster Mikvah Association runs a mikveh on Degel Israel's property. Central PA Kosher Stand is operated at Dutch Wonderland, a seasonal amusement park.

This area was also settled by French Huguenots, who had fled to England and then the colonies in the late 1600s and early 1700s to escape Catholic persecution in France. Isaac LeFèvre and a group of other Huguenots settled in the Pequea Creek area.

Inventions

 Fraktur, the artistic and elaborate 18th- century and 19th-century hand-illuminated folk art inspired by German blackface type, originated at Johann Conrad Beissel's cloister of German Seventh Day Baptists in Ephrata.
 The first battery-powered watch, the Hamilton Electric 500, was released in 1957 by the Hamilton Watch Company.
 The Pennsylvania Long Rifle, otherwise known as the "Kentucky" (Long) Rifle.
 The Conestoga wagon, which started the US practice of opposing vehicles passing each other to the right.
 The Stogie cigar "Stogie" is shortened from "Conestoga".
 The Amish quilt, a highly utilitarian art form, dates from 1849 in Lancaster County.

Geography

Climate
Most of the county has a hot-summer humid continental climate (Dfa) and the hardiness zones are 6b and 7a. The most recent temperature averages show areas along the Susquehanna River and in the lower Conestoga Valley to have a humid subtropical climate (Cfa.)

Watersheds
Almost all of Lancaster County is in the Chesapeake Bay drainage basin, via the Susquehanna River watershed (the exception is a small unnamed tributary of the West Branch of Brandywine Creek that rises in eastern Salisbury Township and is part of the Delaware River watershed). The major streams in the county (with percent area drained) are: Conestoga River and Little Conestoga Creek (31.42%); Pequea Creek (15.02%); Chiques Creek (or Chickies Creek, 12.07%); Cocalico Creek (11.25%); Octoraro Creek (10.74%); and Conowingo Creek (3.73%).

Protected areas
Lancaster County is home to Susquehannock State Park, located on  overlooking the Susquehanna River in Drumore Township. One of the three tracts comprising William Penn State Forest, the  Cornwall fire tower site, is located in northern Penn Township near the Lebanon County border. The site, with its 1923 fire tower, was acquired by the state in January 1935.

There are six Pennsylvania State Game Lands for hunting, trapping, and fishing located in Lancaster County. They are numbers (with location and area): 46 (near Hopeland), 52 (near Morgantown), 136 (near Kirkwood), 156 (near Poplar Grove), 220 (near Reinholds), and 288 (near Martic Forge).

The county's southern portion has some protected serpentine barrens, a rare ecosystem where toxic metals in the soil inhibit plant growth, resulting in the formation of natural grassland and savanna. These barrens include the New Texas Serpentine Barrens, privately owned land managed by The Nature Conservancy, and Rock Springs Nature Preserve, a publicly accessible preserve with hiking trails owned and managed by the Lancaster County Conservancy.

Lancaster County leads the nation in farmland preservation. Organizations such as the Lancaster Farmland Trust, the Lancaster County Agricultural Preservation Board, and multiple municipalities work in partnership with landowners to preserve their farms and way of life for future generations by placing a conservation easement on their property. A conservation easement restricts real estate development, commercial and industrial uses, and certain other activities on the land that are mutually agreed upon by the grantees and the property owner. After ceding their development rights, landowners continue to manage and own their properties and may receive significant tax breaks. The conservation easement ensures that the land will remain available for agricultural use forever. Lancaster Farmland Trust is a private, non-profit organization that works closely with the vast Amish and Plain-Sect communities of Lancaster County to ensure their farms will retain their agricultural value.

Seismicity
Lancaster County lies on the general track of the Appalachian Mountains. As a result, residual seismic activity from ancient faulting occasionally produces minor earthquakes of magnitude 3 to 4. On December 27, 2008, a 3.3 magnitude earthquake was widely felt in the Susquehanna Valley but caused no damage to structures.

Adjacent counties
 Lebanon County (North)
 Berks County (Northeast)
 Dauphin County (Northwest)
 Cecil County, Maryland (South)
 Harford County, Maryland (Southwest)
 Chester County (East)
 York County (West)

Flora and fauna
The bog turtle was first discovered and identified in Lancaster County by botanist Gotthilf Heinrich Ernst Muhlenberg, who discovered the turtle species while surveying the area's flora. The species was named Muhlenberg's tortoise in 1801, but renamed bog turtle, its present common name, in 1956.

Demographics

As of the census of 2010, there were 519,445 people. The population density was 561 people per square mile (217/km2). There were 193,602 households. Of that number 135,401 (69.9%) were families. Of those families, 120,112 (88.7%) had children under the age of 18. There were 202,952 housing units at an average density of 215 per square mile (83/km2). The average household size was 2.62 and the average family size was 3.13.

In the county, the population was spread out, with 24.8% under the age of 18 and 15.0% who were 65 years of age or older. The median age was 38.2 years. For every 100 females, there were 95.10 males. For every 100 females age 18 and over, there were 91.60 males.

5.58% of the population and 8.37% of the children aged 5–17 reported speaking Pennsylvania Dutch, German, or Dutch at home, while a further 4.97% of the population spoke Spanish. 39.8% were of German, 11.8% United States or American, 7.2% Irish and 5.7% English ancestry.

2020 census

Plain Anabaptist (Amish) groups
Lancaster County Anabaptist community founded in c. 1760, has the world's largest Amish settlement, with 37,000 people in 220 church districts in 2017, or about 7% of the county's population. By 2021 the Amish population increased to almost 42,000. The Lancaster Amish affiliation is relatively liberal concerning the use of technologies compared to other Amish affiliations.

Historically speaking, the Amish population in 1970 numbered only about 7,000; that climbed to about 12,400 by 1990 and 16,900 by 2000. It has doubled since then.

Lancaster also hosts other Plain Anabaptist groups. As of 2000, there are about 3,000 Old Order Mennonites of the Groffdale Conference who drive black top buggies instead of the grey top buggies of the Amish in Lancaster County. Other buggy-using Old Order Mennonites in Lancaster County are subgroups of the Stauffer Mennonites with 283 baptized members and the Reidenbach Mennonites with 232. There are about 4,000 members of the car-driving Weaverland Old Order Mennonite Conference. A congregation of 83 members of the Old Order River Brethren lives there as well as 84 members of the Reformed Mennonite Church who have retained the most conservative form of Plain dress of all Plain groups. There are 74 members of the Old German Baptist Brethren in Lancaster County.

Religion
 Protestant: 38% (of whom Evangelical Protestant 23.7%, Mainline Protestant 13.8%, Black Protestant 0.4%)
 Roman Catholic: 9.9%
 Eastern Orthodox Christian: 0.3%
 Other: 1.1%
 Unaffiliated: 50.9%

Dialect
Some County residents speak with a Pennsylvania Dutch-influenced dialect. This is most common in the Lancaster, Lebanon, York, and Harrisburg areas, and incorporates influences from the Pennsylvania Dutch in dialect and in nomenclature.

Metropolitan statistical area
The U.S. Office of Management and Budget has designated Lancaster County as the Lancaster, PA Metropolitan Statistical Area. With a population of 552,984 as of the 2020 U.S. census, the Lancaster, PA metropolitan area is the sixth most populous metropolitan area in Pennsylvania, after the Delaware Valley, Greater Pittsburgh, the Lehigh Valley, the Harrisburg–Carlisle metropolitan statistical area, and Wyoming Valley.

On a national level, the Lancaster, PA metropolitan area is the 102nd most populous metropolitan statistical area as of the 2020 census and the 102nd most populous primary statistical area in the United States as of the 2010 census.

Government and politics

Political party affiliation

|}

For decades, Lancaster County has been a Republican stronghold. The GOP controls the vast majority of county and municipal elected offices in Lancaster County. Specifically, the row offices and all but one county commission seat are held by Republicans, and the GOP holds all but two state legislative seats covering the county. Republicans also hold a majority of registered voters in the county.

In September 2008, the Democratic Party reached the benchmark of 100,000 registered voters for the first time in the county's history. The party had just 82,171 registered Democrats in 2004. , the ratio of Republicans to Democrats in Lancaster County now stands at 1.8 Republicans to 1 Democrat, down from a 3–1 advantage for the Republicans in the late 1990s. Even with these gains, the only real pockets of Democratic influence are in the city of Lancaster. Reflecting this, the two Democrats representing a significant portion of the county at the state or federal level holds two state house seats comprising Lancaster city and its closest-in suburbs.

As a measure of the county's strong Republican bent, it has only gone Democratic once since James Buchanan, who was a resident of the city of Lancaster, won it in 1856. That came in 1964, when Lyndon Johnson carried it as part of his 44-state landslide. However, even then, Johnson only carried it by 798 votes. Proving how Republican the county has long been at the federal level, Franklin D. Roosevelt failed to carry the county during any of his four successful runs for president, though he came within 4,000 votes of carrying it in his 46-state landslide of 1936. In 2008, Barack Obama became the first Democrat to garner 40 percent of the county's vote since LBJ, and only the second to do so since FDR. Even amid his surge in "the T," Donald Trump only managed 56 percent of the vote in both of his campaigns. In the second, Joe Biden became the third Democrat in 80 years to win 40 percent of the county's vote.

According to the Secretary of State's office, Republicans hold a majority of the voters in Lancaster County.

Elected officials

United States Senate

United States House of Representatives

Pennsylvania State Senate

Pennsylvania House of Representatives

Commissioners

Source:

Row officers

Sources:,

Economy

In 2021, the county had a per capita personal income (PCPI) of $61,547, 96% of the national average. This reflects a growth of 5.7% from the prior year, versus a 7.3% growth for the nation as a whole. The county poverty rate was 8.8% compared to a national rate of 11.6%.

In 2005, Lancaster County was 10th of all counties in Pennsylvania with 17.7% of its workforce employed in manufacturing; the state averages 13.7%, and the leader, Crawford County, has only 25.1%.

Lancaster County lags in information workers. It ranks 31st in the state with 1.3% of the workforce; the state as a whole employs 2.1% in information technology.

The county ranks 11th in the state in managerial and financial workers, despite having 12.5% of the workforce in those occupations (versus the state average of 12.8%). The state leaders are Chester County with 20.5% and Montgomery County with 18.5%.

With 17.3% working in the professions, Lancaster County is 31st in Pennsylvania,
compared to a state average of 21.5%. Centre County leads with 31.8%, undoubtedly due to Penn State's giant footprint in an otherwise rural county, but the upscale Philadelphia suburbs of Montgomery County give them 27.2%.

Lancaster County ranks even lower, 34th, in service workers, with 13.3% of the workforce, compared to a state average of 15.8%. Philadelphia County, leads with 20.5%.

Lancaster County has an unemployment rate of 7.8% as of August 2010. This is a rise from a rate of 7.6% the previous year.

There are 11,000 companies in Lancaster County. The county's largest manufacturing and distributing employers at the end of 2003 were Acme Markets, Alumax Mill Products, Anvil International, Armstrong World Industries, Bollman Hat, CNH Global, Conestoga Wood Specialties, Dart Container, High Industries, Lancaster Laboratories, Pepperidge Farm, R R Donnelley & Sons, The Hershey Company, Tyco Electronics, Tyson Foods, Warner-Lambert, and Yellow Transportation.

Auntie Anne's, Clipper Magazine, Lancaster Farming, MapQuest, Turkey Hill Dairy, Clair Global, and Wilbur Chocolate Company are Lancaster County-based organizations with an economic footprint of regional or national significance.

Herley Industries is a local producer of microwave and millimeter wave products for the defense and aerospace industries.

Agriculture
With some of the most fertile non-irrigated soil in the U.S., Lancaster County has a strong farming industry. Lancaster County's 5293 farms, generating $800 million in food, feed and fiber, are responsible for nearly a fifth of the state's agricultural output. Chester County, with its high-value mushroom farms, is second, with $375 million.

Livestock-raising is responsible for $710 million of that $800 million, with dairy accounting for $266 million, poultry and eggs accounting for $258 million. Cattle and swine each accounts for about $90 million.

Tourism

Tourism is a significant industry in Lancaster County, employing approximately 20,000. In the 1860s, articles in the Atlantic Monthly and Lippincott's Magazine published right after the Civil War, introduced Lancaster County to many readers. However, tourism in Lancaster was nearly non-existent prior to 1955. A New York Times travel article in 1952 brought 25,000 visitors, but the 1955 Broadway musical Plain and Fancy helped to fan the flames of Amish tourism in the mid 1950s. Shortly thereafter, Adolph Neuber (then-owner of the Willows Restaurant) opened the first tourist attraction in Lancaster County showcasing the Amish culture. Lancaster County tourism tapered off, after the 1974 gas rationing and the Three Mile Island incident led to five years of stagnation.

Local tourism officials viewed it as deus ex machina when Hollywood stepped in to rescue their industry. Harrison Ford, in the 1985 movie Witness, portrayed a Philadelphia detective who journeys to the Amish community to protect an Amish boy who has witnessed a murder in Philadelphia. The detective is attracted to the boy's widowed mother; the movie is less a thriller than a romance about the difficulties faced by an outsider in love with a widow from The Community. The film was nominated for eight Oscars, and won two. However, the real winner was Lancaster County tourism.

Once again, especially after the September 11, 2001 attacks, tourism in Lancaster County has shifted. Instead of families arriving for a three- to four-day stay for a general visit, now tourists arrive for a specific event, whether it be the rhubarb festival, the "maize maze", to see Thomas the Tank Engine, for Sertoma's annual "World's Largest Chicken Barbecue" or for the latest show at Sight & Sound Theatres. The tourism industry is discouraged by this change, but not despondent:

The county promotes tourist visits to the county's numerous historic and picturesque covered bridges by publishing driving tours of the bridges. With over 200 bridges still in existence, Pennsylvania has more covered bridges than anywhere else in the world, and at 29 covered bridges, Lancaster County has the largest share.

The Lancaster County Convention Center Authority  constructed the $170 million Lancaster County Convention Center in downtown Lancaster on the site of the former Watt & Shand building.

Other tourist attractions include the American Music Theatre, Dutch Wonderland, Ephrata Cloister, Ephrata Fair, Hans Herr House, Landis Valley Museum, Pennsylvania Dutch Country, Pennsylvania Renaissance Faire (one of the largest Renaissance fairs in the world), Railroad Museum of Pennsylvania, Rock Ford plantation, Robert Fulton Birthplace, Sight & Sound Theatres, Strasburg Railroad, Wilbur Chocolate, Wheatland (James Buchanan House) and Sturgis Pretzel House. There are many tours of this historic area including the Downtown Lancaster Walking Tour.

Education
Lancaster County's colleges include Eastern Mennonite University, Elizabethtown College, Franklin & Marshall College, Harrisburg Area Community College, Lancaster Bible College, Lancaster Theological Seminary, Millersville University of Pennsylvania, Pennsylvania College of Art and Design, Thaddeus Stevens College of Technology, and PA College of Health Sciences.

There are 16 public school districts in the county:

 Cocalico
 Columbia Borough
 Conestoga Valley
 Conrad Weiser Area
 Donegal
 Eastern Lancaster County
 Elizabethtown Area
 Ephrata Area
 Hempfield
 Lampeter-Strasburg
 Lancaster
 Manheim Central
 Manheim Township
 Octorara Area
 Penn Manor
 Pequea Valley
 Solanco
 Warwick.

There is also one charter school, the La Academia Charter School. Lancaster Country Day School, an independent day school, is located on the west end of Lancaster City. Linden Hall, an independent boarding and day school for girls, is located in Lititz.

Lancaster County has a federated library system with 14 member libraries, three branches and a bookmobile. The Library System of Lancaster County was established in April 1987 to provide countywide services and cooperative programs for its member libraries. The Board of Lancaster County Commissioners appoints the Library System of Lancaster County's seven-member board of directors. The System is an agent of the Commonwealth.

Sports

Before the Barnstormers, Lancaster was the home of the Lancaster Red Roses, which played from 1906 to about 1930, and from 1932 to 1961. In 2005 the Lancaster Barnstormers joined the Atlantic League of Professional Baseball. The Barnstormers are named after the "barnstorming" players who played exhibition games in the county. Their official colors are red, navy blue, and khaki, the same as those of the Red Roses. This franchise won their first league championship in their second season, in 2006. They won their second league championship in 2014. They have revived the old baseball rivalry between Lancaster and nearby York, called the War of the Roses, when the York Revolution started their inaugural season in 2007.

The Women's Premier Soccer League expanded to Lancaster for the 2008 season, with the Lancaster Inferno. The WPSL is a FIFA-recognized women's league. The Inferno is owned by the Pennsylvania Classics organization and play their home games at the Hempfield High School stadium in Landisville. The Inferno's colors are orange, black, and white.

Amateur teams
In 2004, the amateur Lancaster Lightning football team of the North American Football League played at Pequea Valley High School's football stadium in Kinzers.

Lancaster is home to the Dutchland Derby Rollers (DDR), a member of the Women's Flat Track Derby Association (WFTDA.) Founded in 2006, The Dutchland Rollers have two travel teams, the All-Stars and the Blitz. Both rosters play teams from neighboring leagues, though it is the Dutchland All-Stars that compete for national ranking. Their home rink is Overlook Activities Center, and their colors are orange and black.

Former teams
From 1946 to 1980, a professional basketball team, as the Lancaster Red Roses, (as well as the Lancaster Rockets and the Lancaster Lightning) played in the Continental Basketball Association.

Transportation

Lying on the natural route from Philadelphia to the western part of Pennsylvania, Lancaster County has given rise to many improvements in transportation, such as the Philadelphia and Lancaster Turnpike, later part of the Lincoln Highway, in 1794, a canal in 1820, and the Philadelphia and Columbia Railroad in 1834.

Major roads and highways

Current railroads

, passenger service in Lancaster County is provided by Amtrak, whose Keystone Corridor passes through the county, with stops at Lancaster, Mount Joy and Elizabethtown. A station is planned at Paradise to provide connecting service with the Strasburg Railroad, which runs passenger excursions from nearby Leaman Place to Strasburg.

The principal freight operator in the county is Norfolk Southern Railway (NS). The NS main line follows the Susquehanna River (with trackage rights for Canadian Pacific Railway (CPR)), and leaves the county by crossing the river on Shocks Mills Bridge near Marietta. NS also has trackage rights over the Keystone Corridor, to which it is connected by the Royalton Branch, which runs north along the river from the main line at Marietta, and the Columbia Branch, which runs from the Corridor at Dillerville to the main line at Columbia. Two other NS branches originate on the Corridor: the Lititz Secondary, which runs from Dillerville to Manheim and ends at Lititz, and the New Holland Industrial, which leaves the Corridor around the east end of Lancaster to run east to New Holland and ends at East Earl.

Several shortlines also operate in the county. With the exception of the Strasburg Railroad, all are freight railroads. The East Penn Railroad (ESPN) operates on a spur off the NS branch to Manheim, and on a longer line in the northeast corner of Lancaster County into Berks County. Landisville Terminal and Transfer Company (LNTV) operates on a spur off the Amtrak line at Landisville. The Tyburn Railroad operates some trackage around Dillerville.

Airport
There are two public airports in Lancaster County. Lancaster Airport has scheduled passenger service, and Smoketown Airport serves general aviation users.

Communities

The following cities, boroughs, and townships are located in Lancaster County:

City
 Lancaster (county seat)

Boroughs
Christiana, Pennsylvania is the least populated borough in Lancaster County, . Columbia, Pennsylvania is the most populous.

 Adamstown (Partly in Berks County)
 Akron
 Christiana
 Columbia
 Denver
 East Petersburg
 Elizabethtown
 Ephrata
 Lititz
 Manheim
 Marietta
 Millersville
 Mount Joy
 Mountville
 New Holland
 Quarryville
 Strasburg
 Terre Hill

Townships

 Bart
 Brecknock
 Caernarvon
 Clay
 Colerain
 Conestoga
 Conoy
 Drumore
 Earl
 East Cocalico
 East Donegal
 East Drumore
 East Earl
 East Hempfield
 East Lampeter
 Eden
 Elizabeth
 Ephrata
 Fulton
 Lancaster
 Leacock
 Little Britain
 Manheim
 Manor
 Martic
 Mount Joy
 Paradise
 Penn
 Pequea
 Providence
 Rapho
 Sadsbury
 Salisbury
 Strasburg
 Upper Leacock
 Warwick
 West Cocalico
 West Donegal
 West Earl
 West Hempfield
 West Lampeter

Census-designated places
Census-designated places are geographical areas designated by the U.S. CensusBureau for the purposes of compiling demographic data. They are not actual jurisdictions under Pennsylvania law.

 Bainbridge
 Bareville
 Bird-in-Hand
 Blue Ball
 Bowmansville
 Brickerville
 Brownstown
 Churchtown
 Clay
 Conestoga
 East Earl
 Falmouth
 Farmersville
 Fivepointville
 Gap
 Georgetown
 Goodville
 Gordonville
 Hopeland
 Intercourse
 Kirkwood
 Lampeter
 Landisville
 Leola
 Little Britain
 Maytown
 Morgantown (mostly in Berks County)
 Paradise
 Penryn
 Reamstown
 Refton
 Reinholds
 Rheems
 Ronks
 Rothsville
 Salunga
 Schoeneck
 Smoketown
 Soudersburg
 Stevens
 Swartzville
 Wakefield
 Washington Boro
 Willow Street
 Witmer

Unincorporated communities
Many communities are neither incorporated nor treated as census-designated places.

 Aberdeen
 Anchor
 Arcadia
 Bamford
 Bausman
 Belair Park
 Bellaire
 Bellemont
 Benton
 Billmeyer
 Black Baron
 Blainsport
 Bloomingdale
 Blossom Hill
 Bridgeport
 Bruckarts
 Brunnerville
 Buck
 Buena Vista
 Buyerstown
 Centerville
 Central Manor
 Chickies
 Cocalico
 Colemanville
 Conestoga Woods
 Conewago
 Creswell
 Dillerville
 Donegal Heights
 Donegal Springs
 Donerville
 Durlach
 Eastland Hills
 Eden
 Elm
 Elstonville
 Elwyn Terrace
 Farmdale
 Farmersville
 Fetterville
 Fertility
 Fruitville
 Georgetown
 Gordonville
 Greenfield Station
 Groffdale
 Hahnstown
 Halfville
 Harristown
 Hatville
 Hawksville
 Hempfield
 Herrville
 Hessdale
 Highville
 Hinkletown
 Holtwood
 Irishtown
 Ironville
 Iva
 Jenkins Corner
 Kinderhook
 Kinzers
 Kissel Hill
 Klinesville
 Lancaster Junction
 Letort
 Lexington
 Limerock
 Locust Grove (see also Locust Grove (Bainbridge, Pennsylvania))
 Lyndon
 Martindale
 Mascot
 Mastersonville
 Mechanics Grove
 Mechanicsville
 Milton Grove
 Mount Hope
 Narvon
 Naumanstown
 Neffsville
 Newville
 New Danville
 New Milltown
 New Providence
 Nickel Mines
 Ninepoints
 Peach Bottom
 Pequea
 Rockhill
 Rohrerstown
 Roseville
 Rowenna
 Safe Harbor
 Silver Spring
 Slackwater
 Slaymakersville
 Smithville
 Smoketown
 Smyrna
 Speedwell
 Sporting Hill
 South Hermitage
 Stacktown
 Talmage
 Truce
 Weaverland
 West Lancaster
 Weidmanville
 Windom
 Wheatland
 White Horse
 White Oak
 Woodlawn
 Vintage
 Voganville
 Youngstown
 Zooks Corner

Population ranking
The population ranking of the following table is based on the 2010 census of Lancaster County.

† county seat:

See also
 List of Lancaster County covered bridges
 List of Pennsylvania films and television shows
 List of people from Lancaster County, Pennsylvania
 National Register of Historic Places listings in Lancaster County, Pennsylvania
 Red Rose Transit Authority

References

External links

 County website
Official Discover Lancaster website
Pennsylvania Dutch Country Welcome Center website

 
1729 establishments in Pennsylvania
Amish in Pennsylvania
Populated places established in 1729
Populated places on the Underground Railroad